Shrink is the fourth studio album by German indie rock band The Notwist. It was released on 15 May 1998 by the label Community. The album found the band moving further away from their punk rock origins and pursuing a sound more rooted in electronic music.

Track listing

Personnel
Credits are adapted from the album's liner notes.

The Notwist
 The Notwist – vocals, guitars, bass, drums, keyboards, trombone, trumpet, vibraphone, electronics, samples
 Markus Acher
 Micha Acher
 Martin Gretschmann
 Martin Messerschmid

Additional musicians

 Bibul – percussion
 Johannes Enders – concert flute, tenor saxophone
 Andreas Gerth – Yamaha RY30 drum machine, theremin
 Tobias Kuhn – backing vocals on "Day 7"
 Wolfgang Petters – guitar on "Day 7"
 Christian Schantz – double bass
 Stefan Schreiber – bass clarinet
 Stefan Staudt – vibraphone
 Axel von Hoyningen-Hüne – cello

Production

 Galore – production
 O.L.A.F. Opal – mixing, recording
 Mario Thaler – mixing, recording

Design

 Thorsten Buhe – photography
 Andreas Gerth – cover artwork, cover design
 Planwerk – cover design

Charts

References

External links
 

1998 albums
The Notwist albums
Virgin Records albums
Zero Hour Records albums